Giovanni Dominico Tomati (27 June 1636 – 23 March 1711) was a Roman Catholic prelate who served as Titular Bishop of Cyrene (1700–1711).

Biography
Giovanni Dominico Tomati was born in Caravonica, Italy on 27 June 1636.
On 30 March 1700, he was appointed during the papacy of Pope Innocent XII as Titular Bishop of Cyrene.
On 13 April 1700, he was consecrated bishop by Bandino Panciatici, Cardinal-Priest of San Pancrazio, with Giovanni Battista Capilupi, Bishop of Polignano, and Domenico Belisario de Bellis, Bishop of Molfetta, serving as co-consecrators. 
He served as Titular Bishop of Cyrene until his death on 23 March 1711.

Episcopal succession

References 

18th-century Roman Catholic titular bishops
Bishops appointed by Pope Innocent XII
1636 births
1711 deaths